Esti Budapest (meaning Evening Budapest in English) was a Hungarian newspaper. It was published daily (except Sundays) from 2 April 1952 to 23 October 1956.

History and profile
Esti Budapest was first published on 2 April 1952. The paper was the successor of Vilagossag. It was an evening newspaper and featured mostly leisure- and culture-related news. The paper was the organ of the Budapest Party Committee of the Hungarian Working People's Party and the Budapest City Council.

Esti Budapest ceased publication on 23 October 1956, and was later replaced by Esti Hírlap.

See also
Eastern Bloc information dissemination

References

1952 establishments in Hungary
1956 disestablishments in Hungary
Communism in Hungary
Communist newspapers
Daily newspapers published in Hungary
Defunct newspapers published in Hungary
Eastern Bloc mass media
Evening newspapers
Hungarian-language newspapers
Newspapers published in Budapest
Newspapers established in 1952
Publications disestablished in 1956